The Amarillo Ladies' Open was a golf tournament on the LPGA Tour from 1966 to 1967. It was played at the Amarillo Country Club in Amarillo, Texas.

Winners
1967 Sandra Haynie
1966 Kathy Whitworth

References

Former LPGA Tour events
Golf in Texas
Sports in Amarillo, Texas
Women's sports in Texas
Recurring sporting events established in 1966
Recurring sporting events disestablished in 1967
1966 establishments in Texas
1967 disestablishments in Texas